Carlos Enríquez can refer to:

 Carlos Enríquez (actor)
 Carlos Enríquez (footballer)
 Carlos Enríquez Gómez